Changeling is a soundtrack album released in 2008 based on the film of the same name. In common with all his films since Mystic River (2003), Clint Eastwood composed the music to the 2008 film Changeling himself. The score is jazz- and bebop-influenced, and mainly low-key, featuring lilting guitars and strings. The addition of brass instruments has its roots in film noir and plays to the film's setting in a city controlled by corrupt police. The theme shifts from piano to a full orchestra, and as the story develops the strings become more imposing, with increasing numbers of sustains and rises. Voices reminiscent of those in a horror film score are introduced during the film's flashback scenes to the child murders. Eastwood's bassist son, Kyle, played on the soundtrack. The score was released on CD in North America on November 4, 2008 through record label Varèse Sarabande.

Track listing

References

2008 soundtrack albums
Crime film soundtracks
Drama film soundtracks